Orville Vernon Burton is a professor of history at Clemson University, the Director of its Clemson CyberInstitute, and an author.  He formerly served as Director of the Institute for Computing in Humanities, Arts, and Social Science (CHASS) and professor of History and Sociology at the University of Illinois. He is also a Senior Research Scientist at the National Center for Supercomputing Applications, where he is Associate Director for Humanities and Social Sciences. 

Burton has authored more than a hundred articles and wrote or edited fourteen books. His books include In My Father's House Are Many Mansions: Family and Community in Edgefield, South Carolina that was the subject of sessions at the Southern Historical Association and the Social Science History Association’s annual meetings. It was also submitted for 
a Pulitzer. He also wrote The Age of Lincoln, winner of the 2007 Chicago Tribune Heartland Prize for non-fiction. With civil rights lawyer Armand Derfner in 2021, Burton published Justice Deferred: Race and the Supreme Court, a lengthy survey of race-related cases on the US Supreme Court.

Burton was born in Royston, Georgia and grew up in Ninety Six, South Carolina. He received a B.A. in 1969 for his undergraduate studies at Furman University and received his Ph.D. in 1976 in American History from Princeton University.

Burton was selected nationwide as the 1999 U.S. Research and Doctoral University Professor of the Year (presented by the Carnegie Foundation for the Advancement of Teaching and by the Council for Advancement and Support of Education). He received the American Historical Association’s Eugene Asher Distinguished Teacher Award for 2003. Within the University of Illinois, Burton has won teaching awards at the department, school, college, and campus levels and received the 2006 Campus Award for Excellence in Public Engagement from the University of Illinois.

Selected bibliography
Class, Conflict, and Consensus: Antebellum Southern Community Studies (1982)
In My Father's House Are Many Mansions: Family and Community in Edgefield, South Carolina (1987)
A Gentleman and an Officer: A Military and Social History of James B. Griffin's Civil War (1996)
Computing in the Social Sciences and Humanities (2002)
The Free Flag of Cuba : The Lost Novel of Lucy Holcombe Pickens (2002)
 chair editorial board Slavery in America (2007); online primary sources online
The Age of Lincoln (2008)
 “The South as ‘Other,’ the Southerner as Stranger,” Journal of Southern History, 79 (Feb. 2013), 7–50. his 2012 presidential address
 Dixie Redux: Essays in Honor of Sheldon Hackney. Montgomery: New South Books. (2013) (co-editor with Raymond Arsenault)
Justice Deferred: Race and the Supreme Court. Cambridge, MA: Harvard University Press. (2021) (with Armand Derfner)

References

External links

Year of birth missing (living people)
Living people
People from Royston, Georgia
People from Ninety Six, South Carolina
University of Illinois faculty
Clemson University faculty
People from Clemson, South Carolina